HMS Victoire (or HMS Victor) was the French privateer schooner Victoire that the Royal Navy captured in 1797 and took into service as a fireship. The Navy sold her at the end of 1801.

French service and capture
Victoire was launched in 1793.

On 28 December 1797 Termagant was four leagues off Spurn Head when she sighted and gave chase to a French privateer. After four hours Termagant succeeded in capturing the schooner Victoire, of 14 guns and 74 men. She had been out ten days during which time she had captured two colliers; she had been in pursuit of a British merchantman when Termagant first sighted her. The Royal Navy took Victoire into service as HMS Victoire.

Royal Navy
Between March and June 1798 Victoire was at Sheerness, undergoing fitting as a temporary fireship.

In 1801 Lieutenant James Tillard commissioned Victoire for the North Sea.

Fate
The "Principal Officers and Commissioners of His Majesty's Navy" offered Victoire, of 73 tons, lying at Woolwich, for sale on 16 December 1801. She sold there on that day for £240.

Citations

References
 
 

1793 ships
Ships built in France
Privateer ships of France
Captured ships
Schooners of the Royal Navy